Percival Peter Gleeson (18 July 1921 – October 2015) is an English former professional football inside forward who played in the Football League for Brentford. He later made 367 appearances and scored 111 goals for Southern League club Guildford City.

Career statistics

References

1921 births
Footballers from Acton, London
Association football inside forwards
English footballers
Hounslow F.C. players
Brentford F.C. players
Guildford City F.C. players
Southern Football League players
English Football League players
2015 deaths